The Talisay City Science High School (Mataas na Paaralang Pang-Agham ng Lungsod ng Talisay) is a Secondary Public Science High School system located in  Talisay City, Cebu, Philippines.  It is a DepEd-recognized science high school.

Science high schools in the Philippines
Schools in Metro Cebu
Education in Talisay, Cebu
High schools in Cebu